Back to Basics is the sixteenth studio album by the reggae artist Beenie Man released on 13 July 2004. His single "Dude" reached #26 on the Billboard charts and #7 in the British charts.

Critical reception

Back to Basics received generally positive reviews from music critics. At Metacritic, which assigns a normalized rating out of 100 to reviews from mainstream critics, the album received an average score of 69, which indicates "generally favorable reviews", based on 13 reviews.

Track listing

Charts

Weekly charts

Year-end charts

References

Beenie Man albums
2004 albums
Albums produced by Supa Dups
Albums produced by Timbaland